Belle River is a community in Lakeshore, Essex County, Ontario, Canada. The population was 4,887 at the 2001 census.

Geography 
The community lies in northern Lakeshore in Essex County.

Demographics 
As of the census of 2001, there were 4,887 people, 340 of whom ages 0 – 4, 795 aged 5 – 14, 380 aged 15 – 19, 310 aged 20 – 24, 1,595 aged 25 – 44, 635 aged 45 – 54, 375 aged 55 – 64, 265 aged 65 – 74, 160 aged 75 – 84, and 30 aged 85 and over. 49.6% male and 50.4% female. Most of the residents are white, but 0.8% are Southeast Asian and 0.93% are Black, Filipino, and Latin American.

References 

Communities in Essex County, Ontario